Kill a Dragon (filmed under the working title of To Kill a Dragon) is a 1967 adventure film pitting Jack Palance against Fernando Lamas: Palance is an adventurer and Lamas is a ruthless dictator/warlord. Filmed on location in Hong Kong and Macau, it was produced by Aubrey Schenck and released through United Artists. In the United States the film was double billed with Navajo Joe. Co-star Aldo Ray later appeared in Lamas's The Violent Ones (1967).

Plot
On an island of Hong Kong’s New Territories, a ship’s cargo of nitroglycerin washes ashore due to a typhoon.  The islanders claim the cargo under the law of salvage, but the powerful Nico Patrai threatens to destroy the island and its inhabitants if the nitroglycerine is not given to him in three days.

The village head Win Lim and two other islanders escape Patrai’s men to go to Macau where they seek the help of soldier of fortune Rick Masters who lives on a junk.  Masters defeats some of Patrai’s henchmen who have pursued the villagers. Win Lim offers him one third of the profits of the cargo if he can transport it to Hong Kong.

Masters recruits some of his friends to take on Patrai.

Cast
Jack Palance  ...  Rick Masters  
Fernando Lamas  ...  Nico Patrai  
Aldo Ray  ...  Vigo  
Aliza Gur  ...  Tisa 
Kam Tong  ...  Win Lim 
Don Knight  ...  Ian  
Hans William Lee  ...  Jimmie 
Judy Dan  ...  Chunhyang 
Young Yip Wang  ...  Chang

Quotes
The film's title is mirrored by way of a quote appearing in the film itself. Every dragon gives birth to a St George that must slay the dragon- Win Lim

See also
List of American films of 1967

Notes

External links
 

1967 films
1967 adventure films
American adventure films
Films directed by Mickey Moore
Films scored by Philip Springer
Films set in Hong Kong
Films shot in Hong Kong
United Artists films
1960s English-language films
1960s American films